Maël-Carhaix is a commune in the Côtes-d'Armor department of Brittany in northwestern France.

Population

Inhabitants of Maël-Carhaix are called maël-carhaisiens in French.

Breton language
In 2008, 13.37% of primary school children attended bilingual schools.

See also
Communes of the Côtes-d'Armor department

References

External links

Official website 

 Mael Carhaix 15 July 2009 (c) Andy Clarke

Communes of Côtes-d'Armor